The Chief of the South African National Defence Force is the most senior South African military officer and the professional Head of the South African National Defence Force (SANDF). The Chief is appointed by the President of South Africa.

The SANDF was formed in 1994 following the first democratic general election in South Africa and was created by an amalgamation of the Azanian People's Liberation Army (APLA), uMkhonto we Sizwe (MK) as well as the existing South African Defence Force (SADF) structure of Army, Air Force, Navy, and Medical Service (which was renamed Military Health Service in 1998).

Constitutional role
In terms of the South African Constitution the role of the Chief of the South African National Defence Force is to
 Act as the principal adviser to the Minister on any military, operational and administrative matters
 Maintain a military response capability
 Formulate and issuing military policy and doctrines

Chiefs of the SANDF

See also
List of South African military chiefs

References

Military of South Africa
South Africa